Arceuthobium apachecum, called the "Apache dwarf mistletoe," is a parasitic plant found on the branches of pine trees in Arizona, New Mexico and Coahuila. It has yellowish-green stems up to 7 cm high.

Arceuthobium apachecum Hawksw. & Wiens,  Brittonia 22(3): 266. 1970. = Arceuthobium campylopodum subsp. apachecum (Hawksw. & Wiens) Nickr. in Rothr., Phytoneuron 2012–51: 10. 2012.

References

apachecum
Flora of Arizona
Flora of New Mexico
Flora of Coahuila
Flora of Mexico
Parasitic plants
Plants described in 1970